Rowland Leate Holle (1859 – 3 August 1929) was an Australian-born New Zealand cricketer. He played first-class cricket for Wellington and Auckland between 1883 and 1894.

Life and career
Holle was born in Victoria, Australia. He was employed as a cutter and manager at the Wellington clothing factory Thompson, Shannon and Co in 1883. 

On his first-class debut for Wellington in December 1883, Holle took 5 for 22 and 4 for 20 – all on the first day of the match – but Wellington still lost to Nelson by 39 runs in match in which 40 wickets fell for only 183 runs. In the 1893-94 season when he captained Auckland on their three-match southern tour, he played as a batsman. In the last match, going to the wicket at No. 11 with 13 runs to get, he scored the winning runs to take Auckland to victory over Wellington by one wicket. The Wellington Evening Post described the match as "the most exciting inter-provincial match ever played in New Zealand". Holle wrote an account of the Auckland team's tour which was published as a pamphlet in March 1894: Tour of the Auckland Representative Cricket Team, 1893.

Holle served on the committee of the Auckland Cricket Association in the 1890s. He worked in Auckland as the manager of Arch Clark and Sons clothing factory. He returned to Australia in March 1897 to live in Sydney.

See also
 List of Auckland representative cricketers

References

External links
 
 Tour of the Auckland Representative Cricket Team, 1893 digitised version at National Library of New Zealand

1859 births
1929 deaths
New Zealand cricketers
Auckland cricketers
Wellington cricketers
People from Kyneton
Australian emigrants to New Zealand